Dr. Faguni Ram (2 January 1945 – 25 February 2018) was an Indian politician. He was a minister of state, Bihar and member of the Rajya Sabha, the upper house of the Parliament of India representing Bihar as a member of the Indian National Congress for three terms.

Dr. Faguni Ram, whose father was Baijnath Ram (Freedom Fighter), was born on 2 January 1945. He obtained BA and MA degrees in Geography, as well as a PhD, and married Dr. Sushila Das.

Ram was a member of the Legislative Assembly of Bihar between 1972–77 and served as a minister of state in the Government of Bihar in 1973. He was a member of the Rajya Sabha from 1985–1988, 1988–1994 and from 2000.

Outside politics, Ram wrote Development of Irrigation and its Impact on Agriculture and was a co-author of the 25 volumes of ''Instant Encyclopaedia of Geography.

He and his wife were among the first members of a Scheduled Caste in the state to hold a PhD degree. They always stressed education as a means to self-development and the development of people they served. He served in Bihar State Administrative Services but left to become MLA from Aurangabad.

Ram breathed last on 25 February 2018 in Ram Manohar Lohia hospital.  He was cremated in Nigambodh Ghat.

Awards and recognition
National Integration Award, 1987–88
Citizen of India, 1992
Several colleges and schools named after him in his home town and state.

References

1945 births
Members of Parliament from Bihar
Rajya Sabha members from Bihar
Indian National Congress politicians from Bihar
2018 deaths